"Guilty Love"" is the 9th Japanese single by South Korean boy band 2PM. It was released on January 28, 2015."

Track listing

Charts

Oricon

Release history

References

2015 singles
Dance-pop songs
Japanese-language songs
2PM songs
2015 songs
Epic Records singles
Oricon Weekly number-one singles
Billboard Japan Hot 100 number-one singles